Nathan Hale (September 23, 1743 – September 23, 1780) was an American Revolutionary War officer who fought in the Battle of Lexington and Concord, Battle of Bunker Hill, Siege of Fort Ticonderoga, and Battle of Hubbardton. Hale was taken prisoner by the British at Hubbardton and died in prison on September 23, 1780 at New Utrecht, Brooklyn, New York.

Family and early life 
Nathan Hale was born in Hampstead, New Hampshire, son of Moses and Elizabeth (Wheeler) Hale. He was a descendant of Thomas Hale of Newbury, Massachusetts, who arrived in 1637 from Watton-At-Stone, Hertfordshire, England as the latter part of the Winthrop Fleet and Great Migration.  There is no known relation between Colonel Nathan Hale and Captain Nathan Hale, the American spy hanged by the British in 1776.

In his teens, Hale moved with his family to the area that would become Rindge, New Hampshire. He married Abigail Grout, daughter of Col. John and Joanna (Boynton) Grout of Lunenburg, Massachusetts. When the town of Rindge was organized in 1768, Hale was chosen the first constable of the town, and served as the moderator of the annual town meetings in 1773, 1774 and 1775

Service in the American Revolution 
In 1774, Hale became the captain of a militia company of minutemen.  Once Hale was told of the Battle of Lexington on April 19, 1775, he and his fifty men marched to Cambridge, Massachusetts to join the Army of Observation.

On June 2, 1775, Hale was commissioned as a captain in the 3rd New Hampshire Regiment. They fought at the Battle of Bunker Hill on June 17, 1775.  The Army of Observation (consisting of militiamen from Massachusetts, Connecticut, New Hampshire and Rhode Island) had about 2,400 men and the British had over 3,000. The colonies suffered 450 casualties and the British suffered 1,054 casualties in what has been described as a British Pyrrhic victory.

Hale was promoted to lieutenant-colonel of the 2nd New Hampshire Regiment on November 8, 1776. Achieving success in battle, he was again promoted to colonel on April 2, 1777. In the same year he served under Major General Arthur St. Clair at the Siege of Fort Ticonderoga in early July. 

On July 4, 1777, the British managed to place two cannon and soldiers atop Mount Defiance, overlooking the fort. With no defense against artillery placed on the hill, General St. Clair and the officers decided to evacuate the fort in the dark of night. Hale's regiment and other stragglers from the retreating army were discovered by pursuing British forces at the Battle of Hubbardton a few days later, and he was taken prisoner on July 7, 1777. 

His surrender and subsequent treatment by the British was the subject of controversy. Hale was later released on limited parole by the British, on the condition that he was not allowed to serve in the Army nor return to the enemy lines. He returned to Rindge, New Hampshire on July 20, 1777. Since he had not been exchanged as a prisoner of war, Hale was returned to prison on June 14, 1779. He hoped to be able to exonerate himself, but he died in prison on September 23, 1780 in New Utrecht, Brooklyn.

After his death
"Thomas Moore of Chelsea, who was a soldier in his regiment, told me repeatedly in my boyhood that my grandfather was "as brave a man as ever trod shoe-leather" and added always that he "was the finest-looking man I (Moore) ever set eyes on." His wife was a woman of great intelligence, executive ability and energy of character whom I well remember in a wonderfully vigorous old age." After the age of 90, she was still a great reader, interested in the news and politics of the day. In her latter years, she drew a pension of $600 per year as the widow of a colonel.

References

Bibliography 

 
 
 
 
 
 
 

 

1743 births
1780 deaths
American Revolutionary War prisoners of war held by Great Britain
Continental Army officers from New Hampshire
American people who died in prison custody
Prisoners who died in British military detention
People from Rindge, New Hampshire
American Revolutionary War deaths